Earl's Sluice is an underground river in south-east London, England. Its source is Ruskin Park on Denmark Hill. In South Bermondsey it is joined by the River Peck before emptying into the Thames at Deptford Wharf.

Earl's Creek marks the boundary between St Mary's parish, Rotherhithe and St Paul's parish, Deptford and their successors the London Borough of Southwark and the London Borough of Lewisham. It also marks the boundary between the historic counties of Kent and Surrey. The river is named after the Earl of Gloucester in the time of Henry I.

See also 
 Subterranean rivers of London
 Thames Tideway Scheme

References

Further reading 
 London's Lost Rivers by Paul Talling

External links 
 Earl's Sluice on Diamond Geezer blog.
 Dividing Rotherhithe from Deptford in the mid 1850s: Earl's Sluice, or the Black Ditch

Rivers of London
Subterranean rivers of London
Geography of the London Borough of Southwark